The 2017–18 UEFA Champions League qualifying phase and play-off round began on 27 June and ended on 23 August 2017. A total of 57 teams competed in the qualifying phase and play-off round to decide 10 of the 32 places in the group stage of the 2017–18 UEFA Champions League.

All times were CEST (UTC+2).

Round and draw dates
The schedule of the qualifying phase and play-off round was as follows (all draws were held at the UEFA headquarters in Nyon, Switzerland).

Format
In the qualifying phase and play-off round, each tie was played over two legs, with each team playing one leg at home. The team that scored more goals on aggregate over the two legs advanced to the next round. If the aggregate score was level, the away goals rule was applied, i.e. the team that scored more goals away from home over the two legs advanced. If away goals were also equal, then 30 minutes of extra time was played. The away goals rule was again applied after extra time, i.e. if there were goals scored during extra time and the aggregate score was still level, the visiting team advanced by virtue of more away goals scored. If no goals were scored during extra time, the tie was decided by penalty shoot-out.

In the draws for each round, teams were seeded based on their UEFA club coefficients at the beginning of the season, with the teams divided into seeded and unseeded pots. A seeded team was drawn against an unseeded team, with the order of legs in each tie decided by draw. Due to the limited time between matches, the draws for the second and third qualifying rounds took place before the results of the previous round were known. For these draws (or in any cases where the result of a tie in the previous round was not known at the time of the draw), the seeding was carried out under the assumption that the team with the higher coefficient of an undecided tie advanced to this round, which means if the team with the lower coefficient was to advance, it simply took the seeding of its defeated opponent. Prior to the draws, UEFA may form "groups" in accordance with the principles set by the Club Competitions Committee, but they were purely for convenience of the draw and for ensuring that teams from the same association (or associations with political conflicts) were not drawn against each other, and did not resemble any real groupings in the sense of the competition.

Teams
There were two routes which the teams were separated into during qualifying:
Champions Route, which included all domestic champions which did not qualify directly for the group stage.
League Route (also called the Non-champions Path or the Best-placed Path), which included all domestic non-champions which did not qualify directly for the group stage.

A total of 57 teams (42 in Champions Route, 15 in League Route) were involved in the qualifying phase and play-off round. The 10 winners of the play-off round (5 in Champions Route, 5 in League Route) advanced to the group stage to join the 22 teams which entered in the group stage. The 15 losers of the third qualifying round entered the Europa League play-off round, and the 10 losers of the play-off round entered the Europa League group stage.

Below were the participating teams (with their 2017 UEFA club coefficients), grouped by their starting rounds.

Champions Route

League Route

First qualifying round

The draw for the first qualifying round was held on 19 June 2017, 12:00 CEST. Times are CEST, as listed by UEFA (local times are in parentheses).

Seeding
A total of ten teams played in the first qualifying round.

Summary

The first legs were played on 27 and 28 June, and the second legs were played on 4 July 2017.

|}

Matches

Víkingur Gøta won 6–2 on aggregate.

Hibernians won 3–0 on aggregate.

Alashkert won 2–1 on aggregate.

The New Saints won 4–3 on aggregate.

Linfield won 1–0 on aggregate.

Second qualifying round

The draw for the second qualifying round was held on 19 June 2017, 12:00 CEST (after the completion of the first qualifying round draw). Times are CEST, as listed by UEFA (local times are in parentheses).

Seeding
A total of 34 teams played in the second qualifying round: 29 teams which entered in this round, and the five winners of the first qualifying round. Since the draw for the second qualifying round took place before the results of the previous round were known, the seeding was carried out under the assumption that the team with the higher coefficient of an undecided tie would advance to this round, which meant if the team with the lower coefficient was to advance, it simply took the seeding of its defeated opponent.

Notes

Summary

The first legs were played on 11, 12 and 14 July, and the second legs were played on 18 and 19 July 2017.

|}

Notes

Matches

APOEL won 2–0 on aggregate.

Ludogorets Razgrad won 5–3 on aggregate.

Qarabağ won 6–0 on aggregate.

Partizan won 2–0 on aggregate.

Red Bull Salzburg won 6–0 on aggregate.

2–2 on aggregate; Sheriff Tiraspol won on away goals.

Astana won 2–1 on aggregate.

BATE Borisov won 4–2 on aggregate.

Copenhagen won 4–3 on aggregate.

Hapoel Be'er Sheva won 5–3 on aggregate.

Rijeka won 7–1 on aggregate.

Vardar won 4–2 on aggregate.

Maribor won 3–2 on aggregate.

Rosenborg won 3–2 on aggregate.

FH won 3–1 on aggregate.

Celtic won 6–0 on aggregate.

Legia Warsaw won 9–0 on aggregate.

Third qualifying round

The draw for the third qualifying round was held on 14 July 2017, 12:00 CEST. Times are CEST, as listed by UEFA (local times are in parentheses).

Seeding
The third qualifying round was split into two separate sections: Champions Route (for league champions) and League Route (for league non-champions). The losing teams in both sections entered the 2017–18 UEFA Europa League play-off round.
A total of 30 teams played in the third qualifying round:
Champions Route: three teams which entered in this round, and the 17 winners of the second qualifying round.
League Route: ten teams which entered in this round.

Since the draw for the third qualifying round took place before the results of the previous round were known, the seeding was carried out under the assumption that the team with the higher coefficient of an undecided tie would advance to this round, which meant if the team with the lower coefficient was to advance, it simply took the seeding of its defeated opponent.

Notes

Summary

The first legs were played on 25 and 26 July, and the second legs were played on 1 and 2 August 2017.

|+Champions Route

|}

|+League Route

|}

Notes

Matches

2–2 on aggregate; Slavia Prague won on away goals.

Astana won 3–2 on aggregate.

Maribor won 2–0 on aggregate.

Copenhagen won 4–2 on aggregate.

Celtic won 1–0 on aggregate.

3–3 on aggregate; Hapoel Be'er Sheva won on away goals.

APOEL won 4–1 on aggregate.

1–1 on aggregate; Rijeka won on away goals.

Qarabağ won 2–1 on aggregate.

Olympiacos won 5–3 on aggregate.

FCSB won 6–3 on aggregate.

3–3 on aggregate; Nice won on away goals.

3–3 on aggregate; Young Boys won on away goals.

CSKA Moscow won 3–0 on aggregate.

İstanbul Başakşehir won 5–3 on aggregate.

Play-off round

The draw for the play-off round was held on 4 August 2017, 12:00 CEST. Times are CEST, as listed by UEFA (local times are in parentheses).

Seeding
The play-off round was split into two separate sections: Champions Route (for league champions) and League Route (for league non-champions). The losing teams in both sections entered the 2017–18 UEFA Europa League group stage.

A total of 20 teams played in the play-off round:
Champions Route: the ten Champions Route winners of the third qualifying round.
League Route: five teams which entered in this round, and the five League Route winners of the third qualifying round.

Summary

The first legs were played on 15 and 16 August, and the second legs were played on 22 and 23 August 2017.

|+Champions Route

|}

|+League Route

|}

Matches

2–2 on aggregate; Qarabağ won on away goals.

APOEL won 2–0 on aggregate.

Olympiacos won 3–1 on aggregate.

Celtic won 8–4 on aggregate.

2–2 on aggregate; Maribor won on away goals.

Sevilla won 4–3 on aggregate.

CSKA Moscow won 3–0 on aggregate.

Napoli won 4–0 on aggregate.

Liverpool won 6–3 on aggregate.

Sporting CP won 5–1 on aggregate.

Top goalscorers
There were 246 goals scored in 94 matches in the qualifying phase and play-off round, for an average of  goals per match.

Source:

Notes

References

External links
UEFA Champions League (official website)
UEFA Champions League history: 2017/18

Qualifying Rounds
2017-18
June 2017 sports events in Europe
July 2017 sports events in Europe
August 2017 sports events in Europe